Zernov is a surname. Notable people with the surname include:

 Aleksandr Zernov (born 1974), Russian footballer
 Nicholas Zernov (1898-1980), Christian Russian émigré
 Viktor Zernov (born 1945), Russian footballer and coach

Russian-language surnames